This is a list of women writers who were born in the Ivory Coast or whose writings are closely associated with that country.

A
Josette Abondio (born 1932), teacher, writer, playwright
Marguerite Abouet (born 1971), comics writer, illustrator
Anne-Marie Adiaffi (1951–1994), novelist

B
Angèle Bassolé-Ouédraogo (born 1967), Ivorian-born Canadian poet, journalist
Tanella Boni (born 1954), poet, journalist
Edith Yah Brou (born 1984), digital journalist

C
Micheline Coulibaly (1950–2003), Vietnam-born Ivorian short story writer, children's writer

D
Henriette Diabaté (born 1935), politician, educator, writer
Jeanne de Cavally (1926–1992), children's book writer

K
Fatou Keïta (born 1965), children's writer
Adjoua Flore Kouamé (born 1964), novelist

L
Werewere Liking (born 1950), Cameroon-born novelist, playwright
Aké Loba (1927–2012), novelist, politician
Michelle Lora (born 1968), children's writer, story teller, and academic

N
Marina Niava (born 1985), screenwriter and novelist

T
Véronique Tadjo (born 1955), poet, novelist, children's writer, illustrator

-
Ivorian women writers, List of
Writers
Women writers, List of Ivorian